Lotto Land is a 1995 American drama film starring Lawrence Gilliard Jr. and Wendell Holmes.

Plot
The picture combines the storylines of two single-parent households in a poor, racially-diverse part of Brooklyn. One story concerns a young black man, who would like to remove himself from his drug-using friends. The young man falls in love with a Latina girl, who is intending to go to university on a full scholarship. The second story entwines the lives of those characters' parents: the mother of one character works in the local liquor store; the father of the other works for the telephone company. The narrative unfolds as a winning lottery ticket worth twenty-seven million dollars is sold to a local customer at the liquor store.

Cast
Lawrence Gilliard Jr. as Hank
Wendell Holmes as Milt
Barbara Gonzalez as Joy
Suzanne Costallos as Florence
Jaime Tirelli as Popi
Paul Calderón as Reinaldo
Luis Guzmán as Ricki
Terrence Howard as Warren
John Ortiz as Coco
Daphne Rubin-Vega as Gloria

References

External links
 
 

1995 films
American drama films
1995 drama films
1990s English-language films
1990s American films